Mirek may refer to:

 Mirək, a village in Azerbaijan
 Mirek Mazur, Canadian cycling coach of Polish origin
 Mirek Topolánek, Czech politician
 Mirek Switalski, Mexican sports shooter
 Mirek Smíšek, New Zealander artist of Czech origin
 Joanna Mirek, Polish volleyball player
 Debbie Mirek, American writer, co-author of The Star Trek Encyclopedia

See also